Roisin McAuley is a BBC Radio Ulster and currently presents Sunday Sequence.

Biography
She grew up in Cookstown in County Tyrone went to a convent boarding school, and then to Queen's University Belfast to study history.

She joined BBC Northern Ireland in 1969 and was the broadcaster's first Catholic female newsreader and announcer. She went on to become a reporter for BBC programmes such as Spotlight, Newsnight, Panorama and File on 4. She has also produced and directed television documentaries for ITV and Channel 4 and written and presented programmes on BBC Radio 3 and 4.

McAuley's first two novels, Singing Bird and Meeting Point, were sold at auction to Headline (world rights) who published in 2004 and 2005. The US rights sold to HarperCollins, Dutch rights to House of Books and the German rights to Droemer. The rights to Roisin McAuley's next two books, "Finding Home" and "French Secrets" were sold to Time Warner Books UK in 2005.

McAuley is the sister of BBC broadcaster and musician Tony McAuley and niece of Glens of Antrim painter Charles McAuley.

She lives in Northern Ireland with her husband, Richard.

References

Sources

Year of birth missing (living people)
Living people
BBC newsreaders and journalists
Women novelists from Northern Ireland
People from Cookstown
21st-century novelists from Northern Ireland
21st-century women writers from Northern Ireland
British women television journalists
British radio presenters
British women radio presenters